Eric Tagliacozzo is the John Stambaugh Professor of History at Cornell University, where he teaches Southeast Asian history. He is the director of Cornell's Comparative Muslim Societies Program, the director of the Cornell Modern Indonesia Project, and the contributing editor of the journal Indonesia. Tagliacozzo received his B.A. from Haverford College in 1989 and his Ph.D. from Yale University in 1999. Tagliacozzo studied with Ben Kiernan, James C. Scott, and Jonathan Spence in the History Department at Yale University.

Research and Teaching 

Tagliacozzo has focused much of his scholarship on the late colonial era in Southeast Asia, with an emphasis on people in motion, including the migration of ideas and materials. His first book, Secret Trades, Porous Borders: Smuggling and States Along a Southeast Asian Frontier, 1865-1915 (Yale, 2005), was an analysis of colonial frontier enforcement and contraband activity, and the far-reaching effects of its political economies. It won the 2007 Harry J. Benda Book Prize from the Association for Asian Studies. Several edited volumes also look at Southeast Asia's connections with the Middle East; at the idea of Indonesia over a two thousand year-period; and at the meeting of History and Anthropology generally (and conceptually) as disciplines. The Longest Journey: Southeast Asians and the Pilgrimage to Mecca (Oxford, 2013) examines transnational movement over a span of seven centuries in the first comprehensive history of the Hajj across the Indian Ocean. Several edited volumes also look at Southeast Asia's connections with the Middle East; at the idea of Indonesia over a two thousand year-period; and at the meeting of History and Anthropology generally (and conceptually) as disciplines. 

Tagliacozzo was the Hung Leung Hau Ling Distinguished Visiting Professor in the Humanities and Social Sciences at the University of Hong Kong in 2017-2018. He was cited as one of the "ten best professors at Cornell," and won the university's Stephen and Margery Russell Teaching Prize in 2016.

Books

References

External links
 Homepage at Cornell
 National Public Radio Interview
Water Connections Podcast
Interview: "From Istanbul to Tokyo" (Toynbee Prize Foundation)

Historians of Southeast Asia
Cornell University faculty
Cornell University Department of History faculty
Living people
Year of birth missing (living people)